William T. Cunningham (1930 – May 26, 1997), a Detroit native, began studies for priesthood in 1943 at Sacred Heart Seminary. Cunningham was a parish priest for five years, then in 1961 joined the faculty of Sacred Heart Seminary as an English professor. He was a columnist and book review editor of the Michigan Catholic. Cunningham and Eleanor Josaitis co-founded Focus: HOPE, a non-profit civil and human rights organization intended to help to resolve discrimination and injustice and to build a harmonious community on March 6, 1968, spurred by the destructive 1967 Detroit riot they witnessed. Cunningham died of a liver infection following cancer surgery in 1997.  In 2005, members from the Church of the Madonna and its music director, William S. Harrison, honored Cunningham's legacy with the Fr. William T. Cunningham Memorial Choir, which has won both national and international choral competitions.

Awards
 NAACP's Ira W. Jayne Memorial Medal
 Temple Israel Brotherhood Award
 Bishop Donnelly Alumni Award
 Jefferson Award
 UCS Executive of the Year Award
 Jessie Slaton Award of the Detroit Association of Black Organizations
 National Governor's Association Award (twice)
 1987 Detroit News Michiganian of the Year Award
 Salvation Army's William Booth Award
 Marquette University Alumni Award
 University of Michigan 1993 Business Leadership Award

References

Father William T. Cunningham, The Collection of Archives & Urban Affairs, Wayne State University Walter P. Reuther Library

External links
http://www.focushope.edu

1930 births
1997 deaths
20th-century American Roman Catholic priests
Clergy from Detroit